Lyle David Mays (November 27, 1953 – February 10, 2020) was an American jazz pianist, composer, and member of the Pat Metheny Group. Metheny and Mays composed and arranged nearly all of the group's music, for which Mays won eleven Grammy Awards.

Biography
While growing up in rural Wisconsin, Mays had a lot of curiosity but had to learn many things all by himself due to a lack of available resources and information. He had four main interests: chess, mathematics, architecture, and music. His mother Doris played piano and organ, and his father Cecil, a truck driver, taught himself to play guitar by ear.  His teacher allowed him to practice improvisation after the structured elements of the lesson were completed. At the age of nine, he played the organ at a family member's wedding, and fourteen he began to play in church. During his senior year of high school, at summer national stage band camp in Normal, Illinois, he was introduced to jazz pianist Marian McPartland.

Bill Evans at the Montreux Jazz Festival and Filles de Kilimanjaro by Miles Davis (both recorded in 1968) were important influences. He attended the University of North Texas after transferring from the University of Wisconsin–Eau Claire. He composed and arranged for the One O'Clock Lab Band and was the composer and arranger for the Grammy Award-nominated album Lab 75.

After leaving the University of North Texas, Mays toured in the US and Europe with Woody Herman's jazz big band, Thundering Herds, for approximately eight months. In 1975 he met Pat Metheny at the Wichita Jazz Festival and later founded the Pat Metheny Group. Mays had an extraordinary career as a core musical architect and sound designer of the group for more than three decades. He won total 11 Grammy awards and was nominated 23 times.

After the Pat Metheny Group’s long-form recording The Way Up in 2005, and the unofficial Songbook Tour in Europe and Japan in 2010, Mays decided to retire from public music performance, although he did perform at the Western Michigan University Jazz Club in 2010 and at a Ted Talk event at Caltech in 2011 with his own groups. In an interview with JAZZIZ magazine in 2016, Mays said he had been working as a software development manager because of changes in the music industry.

Work
Mays composed, orchestrated, and arranged as a core member of the Pat Metheny Group, playing piano, organ, synthesizers, and occasionally trumpet, accordion, agogô bells,  autoharp,  toy xylophone,  and electric guitar.  He composed and recorded children's audiobooks, such as East of the Sun, West of the Moon, Moses the Lawgiver, The Lion and the Lamb, The Tale of Mr. Jeremy Fisher, and Tale of Peter Rabbit with text read by Meryl Streep. In 1985, Metheny's and Mays's compositions were performed by the Steppenwolf Theater in Chicago in the critically-acclaimed production of Orphans by Lyle Kessler. Lyle's Oberheim analog synth pad and his voice counting the second hand of a clock at the recording session, "55..., 3..," which can be heard from the bridge part of "As Falls Wichita, So Falls Wichita Falls (1981)," was used for Christian Dior's Fahrenheit Cologne commercials for almost 30 years, from 1988 to 2016.

He was regarded by both professional musicians and music fans as one of the most innovative and creative contemporary jazz pianists and keyboardists, but as a composer, he was even more serious about classical music in terms of advanced harmonic aesthetics and structural development through long forms. He composed several contemporary classical pieces, such as "Twelve Days in the Shadow of a Miracle", a piece for harp, flute, viola, and synthesizer recorded in 1996 by the Debussy Trio. Mays also composed “Distance” for Pat Metheny Group’s Grammy-winning and RIAA-certified Gold album, Still Life (1987, Geffen), "Mindwalk"  in 2009 for renowned marimba player, Nancy Zeltsman, and previously "Somewhere in Maine"  in 1988 for her duo with violinist Sharan Leventhal, Marimolin, and “Street Dreams 3” for his solo album, Street Dreams (Geffen, 1988) with top classical performers in New York City.

Apart from the Metheny group, he recorded or performed in a trio with Marc Johnson (contrabass), Jack DeJohnette (drums), and Peter Erskine (drums) and formed the Lyle Mays Quartet with Marc Johnson or Eric Hochberg (contrabass), Mark Walker (drums), and Bob Sheppard (saxophone). Naxos Germany released the quartet’s live album The Ludwigsburg Concert recorded in 1993 and released in 2015.

He collaborated with electronic keyboard instrument makers, Kurzweil and Korg, to develop their new sounds since he had great knowledge of both computer programming and music synthesis that he learned by himself.

The renowned R&B/funk group, Earth, Wind & Fire, recorded Lyle's most beloved original composition from his first solo album, "Close to Home" for their 1990 album, Heritage as an interlude and he participated in the arranging and recording session for the piece. The prominent Brazilian singer-songwriter, Milton Nascimento, also recorded a remake version of the same piece, "Quem é Você," with Portuguese lyrics for his 1991 album, O Planeta Blue Na Estrada Do Sol. Another Brazilian singer, Zizi Possi, sang "Quem é Você" for her 1994 album, Valsa Brasileira. 

Since Mays was a young child, he enthusiastically exhibited his architectural fantasies with LEGO bricks and kept the passion until his late years. As an amateur architect, he designed his own house, home studio, and his sister Joan's house in Wisconsin.

Mays was particularly influenced by the legendary American architect, designer, the father of American modernism, and fellow Wisconsinian, Frank Lloyd Wright. Mays brought intellectual and organic architectural concepts in his music and sound design based on the innovative integration of many different sources to create a completely new soundscape as Wright achieved through his unique architectural landscape.

Death and legacy
Mays died in Los Angeles at the age of 66 on February 10, 2020 "after a long battle with a recurring illness".

Mays was posthumously awarded the Grammy Award for Best Instrumental Composition at the 64th Annual Grammy Awards in 2022 for his composition "Eberhard".

Discography

As leader/co-leader 
 As Falls Wichita, So Falls Wichita Falls with Pat Metheny (ECM, 1981) – recorded in 1980
 Lyle Mays (Geffen, 1986) – recorded in 1985
 Street Dreams (Geffen, 1988)
 Fictionary (Geffen, 1993) – recorded in 1992
 Solo: Improvisations for Expanded Piano (Warner Bros., 2000)
 The Ludwigsburg Concert (Jazzhaus, 2015)
 Eberhard (self-released, 2021)

As member 
One O'Clock Lab Band
 Lab 74 (NTSU Lab Jazz, 1974)
 Lab 75 (NTSU Lab Jazz, 1975)

Pat Metheny Group
 Pat Metheny Group (ECM, 1978)
 American Garage (ECM, 1979)
 Offramp (ECM, 1982) – recorded in 1981
 Travels (ECM, 1983) – live recorded in 1982
 First Circle (ECM, 1984)
 The Falcon and the Snowman (EMI, 1985) – soundtrack recorded in 1984
 Still Life (Talking) (Geffen, 1987)
 Letter from Home (Geffen, 1989)
 The Road to You (Geffen, 1993) – live
 We Live Here (Geffen, 1995)
 Quartet (Geffen, 1996)
 Imaginary Day (Warner Bros, 1997)
 Speaking of Now (Warner Bros., 2002)
 The Way Up (Nonesuch, 2005)

As sideman 
With Pat Metheny
 Watercolors (ECM, 1977)
 Secret Story (Geffen, 1992)

With others
 Phil Wilson & Rich Matteson, The Sound of the Wasp (ASI, 1975)
 Steve Swallow, Home (ECM, 1980)
 Joni Mitchell, Shadows and Light (Asylum, 1980)
 Eberhard Weber, Later That Evening (ECM, 1982)
 Bob Moses, When Elephants Dream of Music (Gramavision, 1983) – recorded in 1982
 Mark Isham, Film Music (Windham Hill, 1985) – compilation
 Pedro Aznar, Contemplacion (Interdisc, 1985)
 Betty Buckley, Betty Buckley (Rizzoli, 1986)
 Bobby McFerrin, Medicine Music (EMI, 1990)
 Woody Herman, Live in Warsaw (Storyville, 1991)
 Paul McCandless, Premonition (Windham Hill, 1992) – recorded in 1991
 Igor Butman, Falling Out (Impromptu, 1993)
 Toots Thielemans, East Coast West Coast (Private Music, 1994)
 Nando Lauria, Points of View (Narada, 1994)
 Noa, Noa (Geffen, 1994)

Film & Audio Book Scoring
 The Tale of Mr. Jeremy Fisher & The Tale of Peter Rabbit (Rabbit Ears, 1988)
 East of the Sun, West of the Moon (Short Video) (Rabbit Ears, 1991)
 Moses the Lawgiver (Rabbit Ears, 1993)
 Mustang: The Hidden Kingdom (TV Movie documentary, 1994)
 The Lion and the Lamb (Short Animation) (Rabbit Ears, 1996)

References

External links
 Official website
Jazziz magazine
 Lyle Mays on discovering a musical high point, forming a band and more… – Jazz Online

1953 births
2020 deaths
20th-century American male musicians
20th-century American musicians
21st-century American male musicians
21st-century American musicians
American jazz pianists
American male jazz musicians
American male pianists
Jazz musicians from Wisconsin
Musicians from Wisconsin
Pat Metheny Group members
People from Marinette County, Wisconsin
University of North Texas College of Music alumni
University of Wisconsin–Eau Claire alumni